Al-Etisalat Sports Club (The Communications), is an Iraqi football team based in Baghdad was called Al-Bareed before season 2009/10. They play in the Iraqi Premier League.

The Al-Bareed team was founded in 1963, and was merged with Al-Minaa for the 1974–75 season to form Al-Muwasalat. After the season ended, Al-Muwasalat was dissolved and Al-Minaa were reinstated in their place, meanwhile Al-Bareed was consigned to competing in non-IFA competitions as it was an institute-representative team and not a club. In 1992, Al-Bareed was registered as a sports club and entered the lower divisions of Iraqi club football organised by the IFA.

Current squad

References

External links
 Club page on Goalzz

Football clubs in Iraq
Football clubs in Baghdad
Sport in Baghdad